Mount Veve is an extinct volcano on the island of Kolombangara, in the Solomon Islands.

See also
 List of Ultras of Oceania
 List of islands by highest point

References

External links 
 "Mount Veve, Solomon Islands" on Peakbagger
 "Mount Veve" on Mountain-forecast.com

Subduction volcanoes
Stratovolcanoes of the Solomon Islands
Mountains of the Solomon Islands
Extinct volcanoes